Ross Point is a point forming the southeast side of the entrance to Varvara Cove on the southwest side of Nelson Island in the South Shetland Islands, situated 7.85 km southeast of Harmony Point. The point was charted by DI personnel on the Discovery II in 1935.

References
 SCAR Composite Antarctic Gazetteer.

Geography of Nelson Island (South Shetland Islands)
Headlands of the South Shetland Islands